Shaar (also written Al Shaar) is a surname. People with the surname include:

 Bassel Al Shaar (born 1982), Syrian football player
 Edwin W. Shaar (1915–2001), American writer and graphic artist 
 Hisham Al Shaar (born 1958), Syrian politician
 Mohammad al-Shaar (born 1950), Syrian military officer and politician
 Mohammad Nidal al-Shaar (born 1956), Syrian politician and economist

Arabic-language surnames